Longtou (zhuang: Lungzdouz Yangh) is a Township under the administration of Fusui County in southern Guangxi Zhuang Autonomous Region, China. , it had an area of  populated by 32,000 people residing in 1 residential communities and 8 villages.

Administrative divisions
There are 1 residential communities and 8 villages:

Residential communities:
 Longtou(龙头社区)

Villages:
 Tengguang(滕广村), Jiuzhuang(旧庄村), Fengzhuang(凤庄村), Xiaohan( 肖汉村), Natang(那塘村), Tanlong(坛龙村), Nagui(那贵村), Linwang(林旺村)

See also
List of township-level divisions of Guangxi

References

External links
  Longtou Township/Official website of  Longtou

Townships of Guangxi
Fusui County